L'Aiglon du Lamentin Football Club is a football club of Martinique, playing in the town of Lamentin.

They play in the Martinique's first division, the Martinique Championnat National

Achievements
Martinique Championnat National: 4
 1984, 1991, 1992, 1998

Coupe de la Martinique: 3
 1995, 1996, 2009

Trophée du Conseil Général: 1
 1998

Performance in French Cup
1965–66 – Sixth round (lost away against US Quevilly 3 – 0)
1991–92 – Eighth round (lost away against Ajaccio GFCO CF2 4 – 0)
2004–05 – Seventh round (lost at home against Dunkerque CFA 4 – 0)
2006–07 – Seventh round (lost at home against JA Armentières CFA 2 – 0)
2018–19 – Round of 64 (lost away against US Orléans 3 –2 AET)

Current squad

Performance in CONCACAF competitions
CFU Club Championship: 1 appearance
1998 – Semi-finals – Lost against  Caledonia AIA 4 – 3 on aggregate (stage 2 of 3)

CONCACAF Champions' Cup: 3 appearances
1985 – unknown result
1993 – Final (Caribbean) – Lost against  SV Robinhood 3 – 1 on aggregate (stage 4 of 5)
1992 – Semi-final (CONCACAF) – Lost against  LD Alajuelense 2 – 1 (stage 5 of 6)

External links
 2007/08 Club info at Antilles-Foot

References

Football clubs in Martinique
Association football clubs established in 1905
1905 establishments in Martinique